The Learning and Teaching Support Network (LTSN) was an initiative of the United Kingdom higher education bodies to promote high quality learning and teaching in all subject disciplines in higher education. It was intended to support the sharing of innovation and good practices in learning and teaching including the use, where appropriate, of communications and information technology. It operated through a set of 24 centres, specific to different subjects such as Engineering or English, so that good practice appropriate to that subject could be gathered and disseminated, and building up a network of practitioners.

In May 2004 the LTSN merged with the Institute for Learning and Teaching in Higher Education (ILTHE) and the TQEF National Co-ordination Team (NCT) to form the Higher Education Academy.  The Subject Centres continued, but were closed in 2011.

List of Subject Centres

The LTSN comprised a set of 24 subject centres, listed below.

 Art, Design and Communication
 Bioscience
 Built Environment
 Business Management and Accountancy
 Economics
 Education (ESCALATE)
 Engineering
 English
 Geography, Earth and Environmental Sciences
 Health Sciences and Practice
 History, Classics and Archaeology
 Hospitality, Leisure, Sport and Tourism
 Information and Computer Sciences
 Languages, Linguistics and Area Studies
 Law (UK Centre for Legal Education)
 Materials (UK Centre for Materials Education)
 Maths, Stats & OR Network
 Medicine, Dentistry and Veterinary Medicine
 Performing Arts (PALATINE)
 Philosophical and Religious Studies
 Physical Sciences
 Psychology
 Sociology, Anthropology and Politics
 Social Policy and Social Work (SWAP)

References

External links
Sectoral Education
Study In United Kingdom

Educational institutions established in 2000
2000 establishments in the United Kingdom
Higher education organisations based in the United Kingdom